Thierry Klemeniuk (born July 13, 1969) is a French film producer and events producer, founder and former manager of the restaurant-club Man-Ray in Paris alongside Johnny Depp, Mick Hucknell, Sean Penn and John Malkovich, as well as artistic director of Man Ray, New York and producer of the Man Ray soundtrack. From 1993 to 1995, he was the Executive Manager of the famous Bains Douches.
In 2010, Thierry Klemeniuk refocused his career on the positive impact sector, developing projects including the Entertainment Pact, an initiative to reduce the environmental impact of digital.

Production 
Thierry Klemeniuk is known for producing Bully (2001), Spun (2002) and Mary (2005). The 'Star of the Stars', Klemeniuk worked alongside actors including Jack Nicholson, Adrien Brody, Sean Penn, amongst numerous other figures on the movie and music scene.
Currently, Thierry lives between Paris and Los Angeles. His company Klemeniuk Inc advises companies including French AI specialist NamR. and Tech for Good projects such as the Entertainment Pact.

Personal life 
In 2005, Klemeniuk married the actress Gabriella Wright. Their wedding was held in Paris and attended by Sean Penn and Mick Hucknell. They divorced in 2011.

References

Living people
Businesspeople from Paris
1969 births